Charles William Mumy Jr. (born February 1, 1954) is an American actor, writer, and musician and a figure in the science-fiction community/comic book fandom. He came to prominence in the 1960s as a child actor, whose work included television appearances on Bewitched, I Dream of Jeannie, The Twilight Zone, Alfred Hitchcock Presents, and a role in the film Dear Brigitte, followed by a three-season role as Will Robinson in the 1960s CBS sci-fi series Lost in Space.

Mumy later appeared as lonely teenager Sterling North in the Disney film Rascal (1969) and Teft in the film Bless the Beasts and Children (1971).

In the 1990s, Mumy performed the role of Lennier in all five seasons of the syndicated sci-fi TV series Babylon 5 and narrated A&E Network's Emmy Award-winning series Biography.

Mumy is also known for his musical career as a guitarist, singer, songwriter and composer: he is an Emmy nominee for original music in Adventures in Wonderland (1992). As a musician Mumy performs as a solo artist, an occasional guest performer, and as half of the duo Barnes & Barnes. From 1988 through the 90s he performed at the San Diego Comic-Con and other comics-related events as part of the band Seduction of the Innocent (named after the titular book by Fredric Wertham) along with Miguel Ferrer, Steve Leialoha, Max Allan Collins and John "Chris" Christensen. The band released one CD, The Golden Age.

Early life and career
Mumy was born in San Gabriel, California, to Charles William Mumy (December 28th, 1904 - August 7th, 1995), a cattle rancher, and Muriel Gertrude Mumy (July 19th, 1912 - December 29th, 2010). He began his professional career at age five and has worked on more than four hundred television episodes, eighteen films, various commercials, and scores of voice-over projects. He has also worked as a musician, songwriter, recording artist, and writer.

Television and film career
Among Mumy's earliest television roles was six-year-old Willy in the "Donald's Friend" (1960) episode of the NBC-TV family drama series National Velvet, starring Lori Martin. He starred in three episodes of CBS-TV's original Twilight Zone: "It's a Good Life" (November 1961), as a child who terrorizes his town with psychic powers (a role he later reprised along with his daughter Liliana in the "It's Still a Good Life" episode of the second revival series); "In Praise of Pip" (September 1963), as a vision of Jack Klugman's long-neglected dying son; and "Long Distance Call" (March 1961) as Billy Bayles, who talks to his dead grandmother through a toy telephone.

In 1961, Mumy was cast on CBS-TV's Alfred Hitchcock Presents series in "The Door Without a Key", featuring John Larch, who played his father in "It's a Good Life". The same year, Mumy starred as little Jackie in the episode "Bang! You're Dead", featuring Marta Kristen, who later played his sister Judy on Lost in Space. Mumy was cast as Mark Murdock in the "Keep an Eye on Santa Claus" (1962) episode of the ABC-TV drama series Going My Way, starring Gene Kelly. His fellow guest stars were Cloris Leachman (who played his mother in "It's a Good Life"), Steve Brodie, and Frank McHugh.

At age eight, Mumy appeared in Jack Palance's ABC-TV circus drama The Greatest Show on Earth (1963); he was cast as Miles, a parentless boy, in the Perry Mason episode "The Case of the Shifty Shoebox" (1963), and he portrayed Freddy in the "End of an Image" (1963) episode of NBC-TV's modern Western series Empire, starring Richard Egan.

In 1964, he was cast as Richard Kimble's nephew in ABC-TV's The Fugitive episode, "Home Is the Hunted"; as Barry in the NBC-TV medical drama The Eleventh Hour episode "Sunday Father"; as himself three times in the ABC sitcom The Adventures of Ozzie and Harriet; in the Disney film For the Love of Willadena; and as a troubled orphan taken in by the Stephenses in the Bewitched fantasy sitcom episode "A Vision of Sugarplums" (December 1964), on ABC-TV.

Mumy was reportedly the first choice to portray Eddie Munster in the 1964 CBS situation comedy The Munsters, but his parents objected to the extensive makeup requirements. The role instead went to Butch Patrick. Mumy appeared in one episode as a friend of Eddie.

Mumy guest starred in an episode of NBC-TV's I Dream of Jeannie, "Whatever Became of Baby Custer?" (1965). That same year, he also appeared in an episode of Bewitched entitled "Junior Executive" (1965), in which he played a young Darrin Stephens.

Mumy starred in Dear Brigitte (1965), a film adaptation of the novel Erasmus with Freckles, as Erasmus Leaf, a child mathematical genius who develops a crush on Brigitte Bardot (played by herself in the film). His parents, played by James Stewart and Glynis Johns, attempt to manage his obsession.

Lost in Space and beyond
From 1965 to 1968, Mumy portrayed Will Robinson in Lost in Space, the recipient of numerous warnings (including "Danger, Will Robinson") from the show's robot character, voiced by Dick Tufeld.

Mumy was later cast in Bless the Beasts and Children (1971) as Teft, a leader in a group of misfit teenage boys resolved to save a herd of bison from hunters. He also played a musician friend of Cliff DeYoung's character in the TV movie Sunshine (1973), later reprising the role in Sunshine Christmas and in the TV series Sunshine. In 1974, Mumy played Nick Butler in the pilot episode of NBC's The Rockford Files and made an appearance in a later episode in season 1 as a sidewalk artist. In 1988, he played Ben Matlock's genius nephew, Dr. Irwin Bruckner, on Matlock.

In 1996, Mumy was a writer and co-creator of Space Cases, a Nickelodeon television show with themes similar to those of Lost in Space.  Between 1994 and 1998, he played the ambassadorial aide Lennier in the syndicated science fiction series Babylon 5. In November 1998, he played Kellin, a Starfleet officer, in the Star Trek: Deep Space Nine episode "The Siege of AR-558", in which he assists in defeating a Jem'Hadar detachment. To Mumy's delight, his character was human this time due to makeup time and his distaste as being known as an "alien actor"; while playing Lennier in Babylon 5, he was required to wear prosthetic makeup. Mumy later appeared in a 2006 episode of Crossing Jordan and in the Syfy original film A.I. Assault.

In 2018, Mumy appeared in the pilot episode of the Netflix remake series, Lost in Space. His character's name is Dr. Z. Smith, in homage to the character played by Jonathan Harris in the 1965 television series.

Voice acting career
Mumy has narrated over 50 episodes of the Arts & Entertainment Channel's Biography series, as well as hosted and narrated several other documentaries and specials for A & E, Animal Planet network, The Sci-Fi Channel, and E!. His voice acting talents can be heard on animated shows like Ren and Stimpy, Scooby-Doo, Batman: The Animated Series, Steven Spielberg's Animaniacs, Bravest Warriors, The Oz Kids and Disney's Buzz Lightyear of Star Command and Doc McStuffins. He has done voice over work in national commercials for such businesses as Bud Ice, Farmers Insurance, Ford, Blockbuster, Twix, Oscar Mayer and McDonald's.

Music
Mumy is an accomplished musician who plays the banjo, bass, guitar, harmonica, keyboards, mandolin, and percussion. His various musical credits include songs he has written and recorded with America, performed on tour with Shaun Cassidy, and played with Rick Springfield's band in the film Hard to Hold. He created the band The Be Five with other Babylon 5 actors.

Mumy has released a number of solo CDs, including Dying to Be Heard, In the Current, Pandora's Box, After Dreams Come True, Los Angeles Times and Ghosts, as well as nine albums with music partner Robert Haimer as Barnes and Barnes. Their most famous hit is the song "Fish Heads", which Rolling Stone named one of the top 100 videos of all time. He also performs with the Jenerators, a blues-rock band based in Los Angeles featuring Tom Hebenstreit on vocals, electric guitars, and keyboards; Mumy on vocals, acoustic and electric guitars, harmonica, keyboards and percussion; Gary Stockdale on vocals and bass; Miguel Ferrer on vocals, percussion and drums; David Jolliffe on guitar, percussion and vocals; and Chris Ross on drums and percussion. Additionally, Mumy released a Byrds tribute song, "When Roger Was Jim" (2012). In 2017, along with John Cowsill (The Cowsills) and Vicki Peterson (The Bangles) he founded the Action Skulls. Their first CD, Angels Hear, which also included posthumous contributions from the bassist Rick Rosas, was released on September 27, 2017.

Mumy produces and hosts The Real Good Radio Hour, a weekly series on KSAV Internet Radio focusing on various styles of music and the artists who pioneered them.

Lost in Space activities in later years
In 1996, Mumy and his Lost in Space costar Jonathan Harris were reunited at a Walt Disney convention in Orlando, Florida. Mumy worked again with Harris on the retrospective special Lost In Space: Forever (1998), where they reprised their roles in a scene written by Mumy (Harris rewrote his own lines). This occurred the year after the rest of the cast (including both Mumy and Harris) stated in a TV Guide article that the Sci Fi Channel planned to do a Lost in Space marathon while promoting a new movie. Harris was to appear in the planned TV movie, Lost in Space: The Journey Home, but died before production was scheduled to start, in 2002, and it was subsequently cancelled. Mumy read the eulogy at Harris' funeral and was asked to narrate an account of his longtime friend's life on A&E Biography that year.

In a 2010 interview on Blog Talk Radio'''s Lessons Learned, Rick Tocquigny was asked if Mumy was a Jonathan Harris fan before they appeared together on Lost in Space. Tocquigny said that at age five, Mumy was too young to watch his mentor's show The Third Man, which would have been aired late at night, but he was old enough to see The Bill Dana Show.

On June 14, 2006, Mumy got to work with Harris one last time, though posthumously. Years before Harris died, he recorded voice work for the animated short The Bolt Who Screwed Christmas, narrating the film and playing the part of The Bolt. As a tribute to Harris, writer-director John Wardlaw added a scene that reunited Lost in Space cast members Mumy, Marta Kristen, and Angela Cartwright as the animated Ratchett family.

Mumy appears in two episodes of the 2018 series "Lost in Space" on Netflix. He plays the role of Dr. Smith, whose identity is stolen by June Harris, the villain.

Mumy attends Lost in Space reunions and shows, and co-authored a 2015 book, Lost (and Found) in Space with Angela Cartwright.

Mumy and Angela Cartwright co-authored the 2021 book, Lost (and Found) in Space 2: Blast Off into the Expanded Edition.

Other work
Mumy and co-author Peter David published a short story, "The Black '59" (1992), in the anthology Shock Rock, edited by F. Paul Wilson.

He has also written a number of comics. With his friend, the late Miguel Ferrer, Mumy created Comet Man and Trypto the Acid Dog. They also co-wrote the Marvel Graphic Novel The Dreamwalker.

Personal life
Mumy married Eileen Joy Davis on October 9, 1986. They live in Laurel Canyon, Los Angeles with their two children, Seth (b. 1989) and Liliana (b. 1994).

Television and filmography

References

Bibliography
 Holmstrom, John. The Moving Picture Boy: An International Encyclopaedia from 1895 to 1995. Norwich, Michael Russell, 1996, p. 303-304.
 Dye, David. Child and Youth Actors: Filmography of Their Entire Careers, 1914-1985''. Jefferson, NC: McFarland & Co., 1988, p. 166.

External links

 
 
 
 
 Bill Mumy interviews on Outsight Radio Hours
 
 Bill Mumy at SBV Talent
 Bill Mumy speaks about the character Will Robinson

1954 births
American male child actors
American male film actors
American male television actors
American male voice actors
American multi-instrumentalists
American rock singers
Inkpot Award winners
Living people
Male actors from California
People from San Gabriel, California